Sali Ormeni (15 January 1914 – 2 March 1951) was an Albanian army colonel and politician who served as the 20th director of the Albanian State Police. He died on March 2, 1951, one week after the bombing of the Soviet embassy. The government authorities stated at the time that he had committed suicide, but this has later been disputed. His body was found near the village of Papër, Elbasan.

Career
Sali Ormeni was born on January 15, 1914, in the village of Tragjas, Vlorë County. From an early age, he associated himself with the Anti-Fascist Movement for National Liberation and on January 3, 1943, was accepted as a member of the Albanian Communist Party. Distinguished for his bravery during the war, he performed a series of military duties and was eventually promoted to commander of the 3rd Brigade on October 1944. After the war, Ormeni served as commander of the Second Brigade of the People's Division, operative and Chief of Staff of the People's Division (December 1944), commander of the People's Police School (1947) and the following year was appointed as General Director of the People's Police (1948), with the rank of Lieutenant Colonel, a position he held until his death under mysterious circumstances on March 2, 1951. Ormeni served briefly as Deputy Minister of Interior, was a candidate of the Central Committee of the Labour Party in its First Congress (1948) and was elected as deputy of the People's Assembly.

References

1914 births
1951 deaths
Albanian communists